Senén Villaverde Lavandera (1896 – 7 April 1950), also known as Villaverde III was a Spanish footballer who played as a forward. His brothers, Saturnino and Fernando, were also footballers and also played for Athletic Club de Madrid.

Club career
Born in Gijón, he began his career at his hometown club Sporting de Gijón. In 1915, he followed his older brother Fernando to Athletic Club de Madrid, but after just one season he returned to Sporting.

International career
In 1917, he was summoned to play for the Cantabric representative team, a side consisting of players from the provinces of Asturias and Cantabria who played in the local league. He and his brother Fernando were members of the team that participated in the 1917 and 1918 editions of the Prince of Asturias Cup, an inter-regional competition organized by the RFEF. The 1918 tournament basically consisted of a two-legged tie against Centro team, a Castile/Madrid XI, and he scored in both games which both ended in losses. With these two goals, he was joint-top scorer of the tournament alongside José María Sansinenea and Ramón Olalquiaga.

Honours

International
Cantabric
Prince of Asturias Cup:
Runner-up (1): 1918

References

1896 births
1950 deaths
Spanish footballers
Association football forwards
Footballers from Gijón
Sporting de Gijón players
Atlético Madrid footballers